The Great Treaty of 1722 was a document signed in Albany, New York by leaders of the Five Nations of Iroquois, Province of New York, Colony of Virginia, and Province of Pennsylvania.  Also known as the Treaty of Albany, it was made to create a boundary and keep the peace between English settlers and the Iroquois nations. The Governor of Virginia, Alexander Spotswood used this treaty as a way to bring more settlers to North America and expand the British Empire.

Details 
Following the Beaver Wars of the 17th century, the Iroquois confederacy had amassed a great deal of influence in North America.  The British colonies in North America were still relatively small, but growing in influence- especially following the 1664 acquisition of New Amsterdam. The Iroquois re-iterated their dominance over other Native Nations, specifically naming the Tuscaroras, Conestoga, and Shawnee. They agreed to use their influence to protect the British colonies from attacks from Native Americans.

The negotiations included a grievance reconciliation process, which promoted restorative justice rather than the death penalty.  It was based on the February 1722 murder of Sawantaeny, a Seneca hunter, by brothers John and Edmund Cartlidge. One of the two brothers had struck Sawantaeny in the head when he refused to accept rum as payment for furs.

The principal negotiator for the British colonies was William Burnet.  A principal spokesman for the Iroquois was a man referred to as "Captain Civility," a Susquehannock man who spoke multiple native languages.

References

Sources
 
 
 
 
 

British North America
Iroquois
Treaties of indigenous peoples of North America
1722 treaties